Groșii Țibleșului is a commune in Maramureș County, Transylvania, Romania. It is composed of a single village, Groșii Țibleșului, which split off in 2003 from the Suciu de Sus commune to form the present commune.

The commune lies on the banks of the river Suciu, at the foot of the Țibleș Mountains.

At the 2011 census, 91.3% of inhabitants were Romanians, 6.9% Hungarians, and 1.8% Roma.

References

Communes in Maramureș County
Localities in Transylvania